Pierre Razoux (born in 1966) is a writer and historian, a French Senior Civil Servant and a Doctor of Military History. He is in charge of the Mediterranean Dialogue and the Istanbul Cooperation Initiative. He studied law, history and international politics. He served previously in the Delegation for Strategic Affairs of the French Ministry of Defence and he got some years appointment in the Policy Division of the British Ministry of Defence as an exchange officer. He has a long experience in the field of international affairs and defence, particularly on Northern African, Middle Eastern, Caucasian, NATO and European matters.

Career 
He is a specialist on the Middle East, a well-known lecturer and researcher who published 7 books and more than 90 academic articles. He has practical experience on the field, in geopolitics and international negotiations. An renown expert on the Near and Middle East and a specialist in contemporary conflicts, he wrote for the international press.

He works as a full Professor and Research Director at IRSEM (Institute for Strategic Research) in Paris, where he is a regional director in charge of the Euratlantic, Russia, and Middle East.

He lectures regularly in the field of international affairs, strategy, contemporary defence and conflict issues, particularly regarding the Middle East. He gives regular interviews in the media (leading newspapers, magazines, radios, TV) and keeps close links with numerous leading think tanks. He is married and has three daughters.

Bibliography 
 The Iran-Iraq War by Pierre Razoux and Translated by Nicholas Elliott - Nov 3, 2015
 La guerre Iran-Irak (TEMPUS t. 706) (French Edition) by Pierre Razoux
 La Guerre des Malouines by Charles Maisonneuve and Pierre Razoux - Dec 11, 2002
 Le chili en guerre : deux siècles de supériorité navale chilienne en amérique latine by Pierre Razoux - Dec 3, 2004
 TSAHAL by Pierre Razoux - Jan 1, 2014
 Ciel de gloires: Histoire des as au combat (French Edition) by Pierre Razoux
 La guerre israélo-arabe d'octobre 1973 by Pierre Razoux - Jan 1, 1999
 Tsahal : Nouvelle histoire de l'armée israélienne by Pierre Razoux - Mar 2, 2006

Articles 
 Towards a Copernican revolution in the MENA region
 Conference Report: "The Impact of the Arab Crisis on Security Institutions in North Africa and the Middle East"
 What future for post-Gaddafi Libya?
 "Six months after the start of the Arab Spring: impact and challenges for the countries of North Africa and the Middle East and for NATO partnerships"
 NATO in Libya: The Alliance between emergency help and nation building by Florence GAUB - Sandy GUPTILL - Richard D. HOOKER - Karl-Heinz KAMP - Pierre RAZOUX - Rolf SCHWARZ
 The Arab Explosion: Questions and Options for NATO by Florence GAUB - Sandy GUPTILL - Karl-Heinz KAMP - Pierre RAZOUX - Rolf SCHWARZ
 What to expect of the Egyptian army?
 What to think of the political crisis in North Africa and the Middle East
 How to revitalize the dialogue between NATO and the Maghreb countries
 What future for NATO’s Istanbul Cooperation Initiative?
 "NATO and Gulf Security"
 What future for Georgia?
 The keys to understanding the Israel–Russia relationship
 The NATO Mediterranean Dialogue at a crossroads
 Report on the MD-ICI Research Workshop
 Few keys to understand Iran’s foreign policy in Hérodote 2018/2 (No 169)
 Jean-Christophe Notin. La Guerre de la France au Mali in Afrique contemporaine 2014/3 (No 251)
 The Determinants of Israeli Strategic Thinking in Revue internationale et stratégique 2011/2 (No 82)
 Pierre Razoux: New Deal in the Middle East? in Politique étrangère 2009/3 (Autumn Issue)
 Pierre Razoux: Israel Strikes Syria: A Mysterious Raid in Politique étrangère 2008/1 (Spring Issue)

References

External links 
M. Pierre RAZOUX at AEGES.fr
Pierre Razoux at FranceCulture.fr

Living people
1966 births
21st-century French historians